Skinny Boy is the debut solo album by Chicago's keyboard player Robert Lamm released in 1974 on Columbia Records. It has the distinction of being the first solo effort by any Chicago band member. The title track, "Skinny Boy," was also used on Chicago VII with horns added and an extended outro.

The release sold poorly and failed to chart.

Track listing
All songs written by Robert Lamm, except where noted.

 "Temporary Jones" (Robert Lamm, Robert Russell)	3:30
 "Love Song" 	3:10
 "Crazy Way to Spend a Year"	3:22
 "Until the Time Runs Out"	2:26
 "Skinny Boy"	4:30
 "One Step Forward Two Steps Back"	3:10
 "Fireplace and Ivy"	3:40
 "Someday I'm Gonna Go"	1:40
 "A Lifetime We"	3:10
 "City Living"	2:30
 "Crazy Brother John"	2:46

Personnel
 Robert Lamm – lead vocals, piano, electric piano, clavinet
 Terry Kath – bass, acoustic guitar
 James Vincent – electric guitar
 Alan De Carlo – acoustic guitar
 Ross Salamone – drums
 Guille Garcia – congas, percussion
 Gloria Strassner, Jerry Kessler, Jesse Ehrlich, Selene Hurford – cello
 Jan Hlinka, Joseph Reilich, Myer Bello, Myron Sandler, William Hymanson, Yukiko Kamei – viola
 Carl La Magna, Claire Hodgkins, Debbie Grossman, Endre Granat, Jerome Reisler, Joy Lyle, Leonard Malarsky, Robert Sushel, Sidney Sharp, Stanley Plummer, Tibor Zelig, William Kurasch – violin
 William Collette – woodwind
 Pointer Sisters – backing vocals

References

External links
 

1974 debut albums
Columbia Records albums